Joan Givner (born in Manchester, England) is an essayist, biographer, and novelist, known for her biographies of women, short stories, and the Ellen Fremendon series of novels for younger readers that was finalist for the Silver Birch Awards, the 2006 Hackmatack Children's Choice Book Award  for Ellen Fremedon, and the Diamond Willow Awards.

Biography 

Givner obtained a BA (Hons.) from the University of London (1958), and an MA from Washington University in St. Louis (1963), and after a period of teaching in the US, her Ph.D in London in 1972.  She joined the English Department of the University of Saskatchewan, Regina Campus, which in 1974 became the autonomous  University of Regina, and where she was appointed Professor of English in  1981. She remained on the faculty until she retired in 1995 to settle in  British Columbia and take up full-time writing.

In  1978-1979 Givner was Fellow of the Bunting Institute, Radcliffe College, Harvard University.  Givner was editor of the Wascana Review  the literary journal of the University of Regina  from 1984 to 1992,   is a  jury  member for several  literary  prizes, and a contributor to  the Literary Review of Canada. In 1989 and 1990 she was a Member of the Social Sciences & Humanities Research Council adjudication committee, and in 1991, Chair of the Social Sciences and Humanities Research Council adjudication committee. In  1992 Givner won the CBC fiction competition.

In 1958 she married David Givner and has two  children.

Television
Katherine Anne Porter: The Eye of Memory (USA 1986) directed by Ken Harrison, produced by KERA Dallas, and starring Dina Chandel, Eleanor Clark, and Joan Givner as herself.

Publications (selection)
 Katherine Anne Porter: A Life (1982, revised 1991), biography commissioned by Katherine Anne Porter, University of Georgia Press, 
 Tentacles of Unreason (1985), collection of short fiction
 Katherine Anne Porter: Conversations (1987), collection of interviews with writer Katherine Anne Porter, University Press of Mississippi, 
 Mazo De La Roche: The Hidden Life (1989), study of the life and work of writer Mazo De La Roche
 Unfortunate Incidents (1988, 2000), biography of Rachel de la Warr, Oberon Press, 
 Scenes from Provincial Life (1991), Oberon  Press, 
 The Self-Portrait of a Literary Biographer (1993), autobiography, University of Georgia Press, 
 In the Garden of Henry James (1996), short fiction, Oberon Press, 
 Thirty-Four Ways of Looking at Jane Eyre (1998), short stories and essays, New Star Books, 
 Half Known Lives (2001), novel, New Star Books, 
 Playing Sarah Bernhardt (2004), novel, Dundurn Press, 
 Ellen Fremedon (2004), children's novel, Groundwood Books, 
 Ellen Fremedon: Journalist (2005), children's novel,  Groundwood Books,  
 Ellen Fremedon, Volunteer (2007), children's novel, Groundwood Books,  
 Ellen's Book of Life (2010), children's novel,  Groundwood Books, 
 A Girl Called Tennyson (2011), young adult fantasy novel,  Thistledown Press, 
 The Hills Are Shadows (2014), sequel to A Girl Called Tennyson, Thistledown Press,

Plays
 Mazo and Caroline (1992)

References

Further reading
 A Room  of One's Own, Gheorghe, Cristina (ed.) (1992), on the works of Givner.

External links
 Givner web site
 The Mr. and Mrs. William R. Wilkins papers at the University of Mayland Libraries contain correspondence from Joan Givner.

1936 births
Living people
Academic staff of the University of Saskatchewan
British women novelists
20th-century British novelists
21st-century British novelists
British short story writers
British women short story writers
British essayists
British biographers
British autobiographers
British children's writers
British writers of young adult literature
British women essayists
Women biographers
Women autobiographers
British women children's writers
Women writers of young adult literature
21st-century British women writers
20th-century British women writers
20th-century British short story writers
21st-century British short story writers
20th-century essayists
21st-century essayists
Alumni of the University of London
Washington University in St. Louis alumni
Academic staff of the University of Regina